Miloš Filipović (born 9 May 1990) is a Serbian professional footballer who plays as a midfielder for Kolubara.

Career
After youth school career playing for OFK Beograd, he joined to first team, but for first season, he was loaned to Mladost Apatin. Then, for season and half, he was playing for his home-club and made 14 appearances, he was loaned again, this time to Kolubara, where he was playing for one calendar year.

Then he moved to Timok, and later to Voždovac. He played only one league game for Voždovac before being loaned out to FK BSK Borča for the rest of the season. After Borča, for one season he played for Bosnian club FK Drina Zvornik.

In June 2015, Filipovć signed a contract with Zrinjski Mostar. He won three consecutive Bosnian Premier League titles while at Zrinjski, and was also the top goalscorer of the 2017–18 season, scoring 16 goals.

On 22 April 2019, Filipović signed a three year contract with Greek Super League club AEL, but he joined the club after his contract with Zrinjski expired on 31 May 2019. He made his debut for AEL on 25 August 2019, in a 1–1 away league draw against Atromitos Filipović terminated his contract with AEL on 3 January 2020.

On 4 January 2020, he came back to Zrinjski after only six months, signing a three and half year contract with the club. The first goal Filipović scored since his return to the club was in a 1–1 Herzegovina derby draw against Široki Brijeg on 8 March 2020. On 16 October 2020, he scored a hat-trick in Zrinjski's 4–0 league win against Tuzla City. In June 2021, Filipović left Zrinjski.

Career statistics

Club

Honours
Zrinjski Mostar
Bosnian Premier League: 2015–16, 2016–17, 2017–18

Individual
Performance
Bosnian Premier League Top Goalscorer: 2017–18 (16 goals)

References

External links
8 Филиповић Милош at http://fkvozdovac.rs
Miloš Filipović at jelenfootball.com

Stats at prvaligasrbije.com

1990 births
Living people
Footballers from Belgrade
Association football midfielders
Serbian footballers
Serbian SuperLiga players
Premier League of Bosnia and Herzegovina players
Super League Greece players
OFK Beograd players
FK Mladost Apatin players
FK Kolubara players
FK Timok players
FK Voždovac players
FK BSK Borča players
FK Drina Zvornik players
HŠK Zrinjski Mostar players
Athlitiki Enosi Larissa F.C. players
Serbian expatriate footballers
Expatriate footballers in Greece
Serbian expatriate sportspeople in Greece
Expatriate footballers in Bosnia and Herzegovina
Serbian expatriate sportspeople in Bosnia and Herzegovina